NGC 6285 is an interacting spiral galaxy located in the constellation Draco. It is classified as S0-a in the galaxy morphological classification scheme and was discovered by the American astronomer Lewis A. Swift in 1886. NGC 6285 is located at about 262 million light years away from Earth. NGC 6285 and NGC 6286 form a pair of interacting galaxies, with tidal distortions, categorized as Arp 293 in the Arp Atlas of Peculiar Galaxies

See also 
 List of NGC objects (6001–7000)
 List of NGC objects

References

External links 
 

293
Spiral galaxies
Draco (constellation)
6285
Interacting galaxies
59344